Minuscule 341 (in the Gregory-Aland numbering), ε 315 (Soden), is a Greek minuscule manuscript of the New Testament, on parchment. It is dated by a colophon to the year 1296. 
It was adapted for liturgical use.

Description 

The codex contains a complete text of the four Gospels on 268 parchment leaves. It is written in one column per page, in 24 lines per page.

Kurt Aland did not place the Greek text of the codex in any Category.
It was not examined by the Claremont Profile Method.

History 

The manuscript was written by Nicetas Mauron, a reader. It was examined by Passino, Scholz, and Burgon. It was added to the list of New Testament manuscripts by Scholz (1794-1852).
C. R. Gregory saw it in 1886.

The manuscript is currently housed at the Turin National University Library (B. VII. 14) in Turin.

See also 

 List of New Testament minuscules
 Biblical manuscript
 Textual criticism

References

Further reading 

 Giuseppe Passino, Codices manuscript Bibliothaecae Regii Taurini Athenaei, Turin 1742, vol. 2.

Greek New Testament minuscules
13th-century biblical manuscripts